Roch Thériault (May 16, 1947 – February 26, 2011) was a Canadian cult leader and convicted murderer. Thériault, a self-proclaimed prophet under the name Moïse , founded the Ant Hill Kids in 1977. They were a doomsday cult whose beliefs were based on Seventh-day Adventist Church beliefs. In 1978, Thériault was removed from Seventh-day Adventist Church. Thériault maintained multiple wives and concubines, impregnating all female members as a religious requirement, and fathering 26 children. Thériault's followers, including 12 adults and 22 children, lived under his totalitarian rule at the commune and were subject to severe physical and sexual abuse.

Thériault was arrested for assault in 1989, dissolving the cult, and was convicted for murder in 1993 for the death of follower Solange Boilard. He had previously killed an infant named Samuel Giguère, while two of his disciples, Geraldine Gagné Auclair and Gabrielle Nadeau, died following homeopathic treatments administered to them by Thériault. Thériault received a life sentence, which he was serving when he was murdered at Dorchester Penitentiary in 2011. Thériault, along with Robert Pickton, Clifford Olson and Paul Bernardo, has been considered one of Canada's most notorious criminals since the 1980s.

Early life
Roch Thériault was born on May 16, 1947, in Saguenay, Quebec, Canada, into a French-Canadian family, and raised in Thetford Mines. As a child Thériault was considered to be very intelligent, but dropped out of school in the seventh grade and began to teach himself the Old Testament of the Bible. Thériault believed that the end of the world was near, and would be brought on by the war between good and evil. Thériault converted from Catholicism to the Seventh-day Adventist Church, and began practising the denomination's regular holistic beliefs which encouraged a healthy lifestyle free of unhealthy foods and tobacco.

Ant Hill Kids
In the mid-1970's, Thériault convinced a group of people to leave their jobs and homes to join him in a religious movement. Thériault formed the cult in 1977 in Sainte-Marie, Quebec with the goal to form a commune where people could freely listen to his motivational speeches, live in unity and equality, and be free of sin. He prohibited the group from remaining in contact with their families and with the Seventh-day Adventist Church, as this was against his cult's values of freedom. Thériault's fear of the end of the world grew, claiming that God had warned him that it would come in February 1979, and used the commune to prepare for it. In 1978, in preparation, Thériault moved his commune by hiking to a mountainside he called "Eternal Mountain" in Saint-Jogues, in the sparsely populated Gaspé Peninsula, where he claimed they could all be saved. There, Thériault made the commune build their town while he relaxed, comparing them to ants working in an ant hill, naming the group the Ant Hill Kids. In February 1979, when the apocalypse did not occur, people started questioning Thériault's wisdom, but he defended himself saying that time on Earth and in God's world were not parallel, and that therefore it was a miscalculation. To expand the community as well as keep the members devoted, Thériault married and impregnated all of the women, fathering over 20 children with 9 female members of the group, and by the 1980s there were nearly 40 members. Followers were made to wear identical tunics to represent equality and their devotion to the commune.

In 1984, the group relocated from Quebec to a new site near Burnt River, a hamlet in Central Ontario now part of the city of Kawartha Lakes.

Abuse
Following the cult's formation, Thériault began to move away from being a motivational leader as his drinking problem worsened, becoming increasingly totalitarian over the lives of his followers and irrational in his beliefs. Members were not allowed to speak to each other when he was not present, nor were they allowed to have sex with each other without his permission. Thériault used his charisma to cover for his increasingly abusive and erratic behaviour, and none of the other members questioned his judgement or openly blamed him for any physical, mental or emotional damage. Thériault began to inflict punishments on followers that he considered to be straying, by spying on them and claiming that God told him what they did. If a person wished to leave the commune, Thériault would hit them with either a belt or hammer, suspend them from the ceiling, pluck each of their body hairs individually, or even defecate on them. The Ant Hill Kids raised money for living by selling baked goods, and members who did not bring in enough money were also punished.

Over time, Thériault's punishments became increasingly extreme and violent, including making members break their own legs with sledgehammers, sit on lit stoves, shoot each other in the shoulders, and eat dead mice and feces. A follower would sometimes be asked to cut off another follower's toes with wire cutters to prove loyalty. The abuse extended to the cult's children, who were sexually abused, held over fires, or nailed to trees while other children threw stones at them. One of Thériault's wives left a newborn child, Eleazar Lavallée, outside to die in freezing temperatures to keep him away from the abuse. Thériault attempted to backtrack to the original religious mission of the commune, beginning to strongly believe in purifying his followers and ridding them of their sins through abusive purification sessions where the members would be completely nude as he whipped and beat them. Thériault claimed to be a holy being, and started performing unnecessary amateur surgical operations on sick members to demonstrate his healing powers. These "surgeries" included injecting a 94% ethanol solution into stomachs, or performing circumcisions on the children and adults of the group. In 1987, social workers removed 17 of the children from the commune. However, Thériault faced no repercussions for his abusive acts.

In 1989, when follower Solange Boilard complained of an upset stomach, Thériault performed another amateur surgery without anaesthesia. He laid her naked on a table, and punched her in the stomach, then forced a plastic tube into her rectum to perform a crude enema with molasses and olive oil. He cut open her abdomen with a knife and ripped out part of her intestines with his bare hands. Thériault made another member, Gabrielle Lavallée, stitch her up using needle and thread, and had the other women shove a tube down her throat and blow through it. Boilard died the next day from the damage inflicted by the procedures. Claiming to have the power of resurrection, Thériault bored a hole into Boilard's skull with a drill and then had other male members (along with himself) ejaculate into the cavity. When Boilard did not return to life, her corpse was buried a short distance from the Ant Hill Kids' commune.

Arrest and conviction
Lavallée underwent harsh treatment at the Ontario commune during the late 1980s, suffering welding torch burns to her genitals, a hypodermic needle breaking off in her back, and eight of her teeth being forcibly removed. Lavallée attempted to escape from the commune after Thériault cut off parts of her breast and smashed her head in with the blunt side of an axe, but upon her return he removed one of her fingers with wire cutters, pinned her hand to a wooden table with a hunting knife, and then used a cleaver to amputate her arm.

In 1989, Thériault was arrested for assault after Lavallée had fled the commune again and contacted authorities, effectively dissolving the Ant Hill Kids. Provincial authorities had long-held suspicions about Thériault's cult due to the particularly primitive living conditions of its membership, but because the commune was officially registered as a church, officials were legally unable to investigate the adults, and could not do much except ensure the welfare of the children. Thériault was found guilty of assault for the amputation of Lavallée's arm and received a sentence of 12 years imprisonment. The vast majority of the cult's followers abandoned Thériault after his arrest, but during his imprisonment he fathered another four children with remaining female members during conjugal visits. Lavallée's report allowed further investigation into Thériault's actions, exposing the wider abuses at the communes and Solange Boilard's murder. In 1993, Thériault pleaded guilty to second-degree murder for the death of Solange Boilard, and was sentenced to life imprisonment. In 2000, Thériault was transferred to Dorchester Penitentiary, a medium-security prison in Dorchester, New Brunswick. In 2002, Thériault was rejected for parole as he was considered too high a risk to re-offend, and he never applied again.

In 2009, Theriault tried to sell his artwork on a United States-based website MurderAuction.com, which called itself a "true crime auction house" and was willing to sell some of Theriault's drawings and poetry. The Correctional Service of Canada prevented Theriault's works leaving Dorchester Penitentiary, and Stockwell Day, the Canadian federal Public Safety Minister at the time, wrote to the Correctional Service to express concern that the killer was benefiting from work in prison.

Death and aftermath
On February 26, 2011, at age 63, Thériault was found dead near his cell at Dorchester Penitentiary. His death is believed to be the result of an altercation with his cellmate, Matthew Gerrard MacDonald, a 60-year-old convicted murderer from Port au Port, Newfoundland and Labrador, who was charged with the killing. MacDonald pleaded guilty to second-degree murder and was sentenced to life in prison, having already been serving a life sentence for a previous murder charge. MacDonald had stabbed Thériault in the neck with a shiv, walked to the guards' station, handed them the weapon, and proclaimed "That piece of shit is down on the range. Here's the knife, I've sliced him up."

The 2002 film Savage Messiah depicts Thériault's crimes against his followers and the ensuing legal recourse. The film stars Luc Picard as Thériault, and Polly Walker as Paula Jackson, the social worker whose investigation revealed the crimes. Gabrielle Lavallée wrote a memoir of her life in the sect entitled L'alliance de la brebis ("Alliance of the Sheep"),

References

Sources
 Savage Messiah, a compilation by two journalists of Thériault's life until his arrest.

External links
CTV news report about Thériault
 

1947 births
2011 deaths
20th-century apocalypticists
20th-century Canadian criminals
Canadian male criminals
Canadian people convicted of murder
Canadian people convicted of child sexual abuse
Canadian prisoners sentenced to life imprisonment
Canadian people who died in prison custody
Founders of new religious movements
French Quebecers
People convicted of murder by Canada
Place of birth missing
Prisoners sentenced to life imprisonment by Canada
Prisoners murdered in custody
Prisoners who died in Canadian detention
Prophets
Cult leaders
Murdered criminals